The 1916 Rock Island Independents season was the team's last season held at Island City Park, before moving into Douglas Park. The season resulted in the team posting a 5-3-1 record.

Schedule

References

Rock Island Independents seasons
Rock Island
Rock Island